Caroline County Public Schools may refer to:
 Caroline County Public Schools (Maryland)
 Caroline County Public Schools (Virginia)